What Do Men Know? (Swedish: Vad veta väl männen) is a 1933 Swedish drama film directed by Edvin Adolphson and starring Anders de Wahl, Birgit Tengroth and Håkan Westergren. It was shot at the Råsunda Studios in Stockholm. The film's sets were designed by the art director Arne Åkermark. It is a remake of the German film What Men Know released earlier in the same year.

Synopsis
A travelling salesman has a relationship with the daughter of a second hand bookseller, but then leaves before she discovers she is pregnant.

Cast
 Anders de Wahl as 	Hjalmar Björklund
 Birgit Tengroth as 	Margit Björklund
 Håkan Westergren as 	Gösta Bergman
 Tore Svennberg as 	Uncle Björnbom
 Margit Manstad as 	Annie Kron
 Harry Roeck Hansen as Fritz Hellberg
 Nils Wahlbom as 	Blomkvist
 Constance Gibson as 	Mrs. Blomkvist
 Marianne Löfgren as 	Gertrud Blomkvist
 Gull Natorp as 	Mrs. Holm
 Hilda Borgström as 	Hedvig
 Emmy Albiin as 	Old Woman 
 Wiktor Andersson as Barker 
 Helga Brofeldt as 	Sales woman 
 Martha Colliander as 	Alma Wickel 
 Emil Fjellström as 	Postman 
 Erik Forslund as 	Waiter 
 Knut Frankman as 	Clerk 
 Anna-Lisa Fröberg as 	Mrs. Möller 
 Wictor Hagman as Shop assistant 
 Richard Lund as 	Director Abraham 
 Anna Olin as Sales woman 
 Hjalmar Peters as 	Mr. Norén 
 Albert Ståhl as 	Mr. Möller 
 Ruth Weijden as 	Sales woman

References

Bibliography 
 Qvist, Per Olov & von Bagh, Peter. Guide to the Cinema of Sweden and Finland. Greenwood Publishing Group, 2000.

External links 
 

1933 films
1933 drama films
Swedish drama films
1930s Swedish-language films
Swedish black-and-white films
Films directed by Edvin Adolphson
1930s Swedish films